Grant Connell and Patrick Galbraith were the defending champions, but lost in the quarterfinals this year.

Jacco Eltingh and Paul Haarhuis won the title, defeating Jakob Hlasek and John McEnroe 7–6, 6–4 in the final.

Seeds
All seeds receive a bye into the second round.

Draw

Finals

Top half

Bottom half

External links
Draw

Tennis tournaments in Japan
1995 ATP Tour
Tokyo Indoor